And God Created Woman may refer to:

 And God Created Woman (1956 film), directed by Roger Vadim, starring Brigitte Bardot
 And God Created Woman (1988 film), directed by Roger Vadim, starring Rebecca De Mornay
 "And God Created Woman" (Father Ted), an episode of Father Ted
 "And God Created Woman", a song by Prince from the Love Symbol Album

See also
 Et Dieu Créa La Femme, a 1990 album by The Times